A migrant levy is a fee imposed on an immigrant by their receiving country.

There are pros and cons of having a migrant levy. It generates revenue for the government of the host country. However, it serves as a financial burden to immigrants, which in turn serves as a barrier on immigration. From a neoliberal economics perspective, it also serves as an economic inefficiency (as do any other government interventions into immigration).

The International Labour Organization describes migrant levies in the following way:
"Some governments of labour-receiving countries earn sizeable revenues through levies on firms employing foreign workers, the burden of which may partly or fully be passed on to the workers themselves. Malaysia and Singapore are examples of countries using selective levies."

References 

Immigration law